The 1994–95 Elitserien was the 61st season of the top division of Swedish handball. 12 teams competed in the league. The league was split into an autumn league and a spring league. The eight highest placed teams in the autumn league qualified for the spring league. HK Drott won the regular season, but Redbergslids IK won the playoffs and claimed their 14th Swedish title.

League tables

Autumn

Spring

Playoffs

Quarterfinals
 IFK Skövde–IFK Kristianstad 32–36, 36–33, 26–23 (IFK Skövde won series 2–1)
 IK Sävehof–IF GUIF 24–27, 26–20, 28–26 a.e.t. (IK Sävehof won series 2–1)

Semifinals
 Redbergslids IFK Skövde 23–20, 21–25, 24–23 (Redbergslids IK won series 2–1)
 HK Drott–IK Sävehof 34–32 a.e.t., 36–29 (HK Drott won series 2–0)

Finals
 Redbergslids IK–HK Drott 24–40, 26–21, 16–17, 26–23, 19–17 (Redbergslids IK won series 3–2)

References 

Swedish handball competitions